Tshewang Lhamo is a Bhutanese politician who has been a member of the National Assembly of Bhutan, since October 2018. Previously, she was a member of the National Council of Bhutan from 2008 to 2013.

Education 
She holds a Bachelor's degree in commerce and a diploma in hospitality and management.

Political career 
Lhamo was elected to the National Council of Bhutan from Chhukha constituency in the 2008 Bhutanese National Council election.

She ran for the seat of the National Council of Bhutan from Chhukha constituency in the 2013 Bhutanese National Council election, but was unsuccessful.

She was elected to the National Assembly of Bhutan as a candidate of DNT from Constituency Bongo-Chapchha in 2018 Bhutanese National Assembly election. She received 6,632 votes and defeated Pempa, a candidate of Druk Phuensum Tshogpa.

References 

Bhutanese politicians

1982 births
Living people
Druk Nyamrup Tshogpa politicians
Bhutanese MNAs 2018–2023
People from Chukha District
Bhutanese women in politics
Druk Nyamrup Tshogpa MNAs
Members of the National Council (Bhutan)